A cowl unit is a body style of diesel locomotive. The terminology is a North American one, though similar locomotives exist elsewhere.  A cowl unit is one with full-width enclosing bodywork, similar to the cab unit style of earlier locomotives, but unlike the cab unit style, the bodywork is merely a casing and is not load-bearing.  All the strength is in the locomotive's frame, beneath the floor, rather than the bridge-truss load-bearing carbody of the earlier type.

Cowl units were originally produced at the request of the Santa Fe, had a full-width 'cowl' body built on a hood unit frame which provided all the structural strength; the bodywork was cosmetic, rather than a load-bearing bridge truss frame as in cab units.

Most cowl units have been passenger-hauling locomotives.  In this service, the cowl unit's full width bodywork and sleek sides match the passenger cars, do not allow unwanted riders, and allow the decorative, advertising paintwork desired by passenger operators. An additional benefit is that the locomotive can be more easily cleaned by going through the passenger-car washers. The cowl unit allows the basic structure of the locomotive to be identical to a freight-oriented hood unit type.

The main disadvantage of the cowl unit is low rear visibility from the cab of the locomotive. The EMD SD50F and SD60F, GE C40-8M and BBD HR-616 were given a Draper Taper (named after its creator, William L. Draper, a former Canadian National assistant chief of motive power) where the body is narrower immediately behind the cab, and gradually widens further after, although the roof remains full-width the length of the locomotive.  This improves rear visibility somewhat, but the locomotives still cannot lead a train in reverse as a hood unit can because they do not have vision in the rear or ditch lights in the rear.

Passenger-oriented cowl units 

 EMD FP45
 EMD SDP40F
 EMD F40C
 EMD F40PH
 EMD F40PHR
 EMD F40PH-2
 EMD F40PH-2CAT (rebuild)
 EMD F40PH-2M
 EMD GP40FH-2M (MK/MPI rebuild)
 EMD F59PH
 EMD F59PHI
 EMD F69PHAC
 EMD DE30AC
 EMD DM30AC
 EMD F125
 GE U30CG
 GE P30CH
 GE P40DC
 GE P32AC-DM
 GE P42DC
 MPI F40PHL-2
 MPI F40PH-2C
 MPI F40PH-3C
 MPI MP36PH-3C
 MPI MP36PH-3S
 MPI MP40PH-3C
 MPI MP54AC
 Siemens Charger
 Bombardier ALP-45DP
 EMD/Alstom PL42AC

Freight-oriented cowl units 

 EMD F45
 EMD FP45
 EMD GP40FH-2
 EMD SDP40F (SDF40-2)
 GMD SD40-2F
 GMD SD50F
 GMD SD60F
 GE C40-8M
 BBD HR-616

Export/license-built cowl units 

 EMD AT42C
 EMD FT36HCW-2
 GE UM12C (Philippine service)

LMS 10000 & 10001
The LMS Diesels 10000 & 10001, later classified as British Rail Class D16/1, were introduced in 1947. These were Great Britain's first mainline diesel locomotives, coming about a decade after America's first cab units. Despite their streamlined exterior, they are actually cowl units rather than cab units. It is easy to misinterpret this as in North America, cowl designs are more angular, while cab designs have a similar curved streamlining.

References
 Pinkepank, Jerry A., and Marre, Louis A. (1979). Diesel Spotter’s Guide Update, pp. 70–79.Kalmbach Publishing .

Diesel locomotives
Locomotive body styles